Trond Bersu (born 4 January 1984 in Skjåk, Norway) is a Norwegian drummer and producer.

Career 
During his music studies on the jazz program at the Trondheim musikkonservatorium Bersu started the band PELbO together with fellow students Ine Hoem and Kristoffer Lo. Their self titled debut album was nominated for the 2010 Open class Spellemannprisen. The second album release was Days Of Transcendence (2011).

In Trondheim he also collaborated with another fellow student Ingrid Helene Håvik and later on when established in Oslo, they started the band Highasakite together. Their debut album All That Floats Will Rain (2012) was well received, but and was nominated for This year's newcomer at Spellemannprisen the same year. The next album Silent Treatment received the Spellemannprisen as This year's pop group.

Honors 
2014: Spellemannprisen as This year's pop group for the album Silent Treatment
2016: Spellemannprisen as This year's pop group for the album Camp Echo

Discography 

With PELbO
2010: PELbO (Riot Factory)
2011: Days Of Transcendence (Riot Factory)

With Machina
2011: So Much For Dancing (Øra Fonogram)

With Highasakite
2012: All That Floats Will Rain (Riot Factory)
2014: Silent Treatment (Propeller Recordings)
2016: Camp Echo (Propeller Recordings)
2018: Out of Order-single (Propeller Recordings)
2018: Elastic State Of Mind-single (Producer and musician) (Propeller Recordings)
2019: Uranium Heart (Producer and musician)(Propeller Recordings)
2020: The Bare Romantic 1 & 2 (Producer and musician) (Propeller Recordings)

With Lydmor

2018: I Told You I´d Tell Them Our Story (Producer,musician and mix engineer) (Mermaid Records)

With Ine Hoem
2015: Angerville (Propeller Recordings)

Production/Songwriting credits

References

External links 
Pelbo – Join The Game (live) on YouTube

21st-century Norwegian drummers
Norwegian jazz drummers
Male drummers
Norwegian percussionists
Norwegian electronic musicians
Norwegian composers
Norwegian male composers
Norwegian University of Science and Technology alumni
Spellemannprisen winners
1984 births
Living people
People from Skjåk
21st-century Norwegian male musicians
Male jazz musicians
PELbO members